Coda is the first compilation album by the English rock band Led Zeppelin. The album is a collection of rejected tracks from various sessions during Led Zeppelin's twelve-year career. It was released on 19 November 1982, almost two years after the group had officially disbanded following the death of drummer John Bonham. The word coda, meaning a passage that ends a musical piece following the main body, was therefore chosen as the title.

Background
The fifth Swan Song Records album for the band, Coda was released to honour contractual commitments to Atlantic Records and also to cover tax demands on previous monies earned. It cleared away nearly all of the leftover tracks from the various studio sessions of the 1960s and 1970s. The album was a collection of eight tracks spanning the length of Zeppelin's twelve-year history. Atlantic counted the release as a studio album, as Swan Song had owed the label a final studio album from the band. According to Martin Popoff, "there's conjecture that Jimmy [Page] called 'We're Gonna Groove' a studio track and 'I Can't Quit You Baby' a rehearsal track because Swan Song owed Atlantic one more studio album specifically."

Guitarist Jimmy Page explained that part of the reasoning for the album's release related to the popularity of unofficial Led Zeppelin recordings which continued to be circulated by fans: "Coda was released, basically, because there was so much bootleg stuff out. We thought, "Well, if there's that much interest, then we may as well put the rest of our studio stuff out". As John Paul Jones recalled: "They were good tracks. A lot of it was recorded around the time punk was really happening... basically there wasn't a lot of Zeppelin tracks that didn't go out. We used everything."

Songs
Side one

"We're Gonna Groove" opens the album and came from a January 1970 concert at the Royal Albert Hall, with the guitar parts overdubbed and the original guitar part removed—this can be heard in the original Royal Albert Hall show on 9 January 1970. The original album notes incorrectly said that it was recorded at Morgan Studios in June 1969. This song was used to open a number of concerts on their early 1970 tours and was originally intended to be recorded for inclusion in Led Zeppelin II.

"Poor Tom" is from sessions for Led Zeppelin III, having been recorded at Olympic Studios in June 1970.

"Walter's Walk" is a leftover from the sessions for Houses of the Holy (which took place in April and May 1972).

"I Can't Quit You Baby" is taken from the same concert as "We're Gonna Groove" but was listed as a rehearsal in the original liner notes. The recording was edited to remove the overall "live" feel: the crowd noise as well as the beginning and ending of the song were deleted. Crowd tracks were muted on the multi-track mixdown on this recording as with "We're Gonna Groove".

Side two

Side two contains three outtakes from the band's previous album In Through the Out Door, plus a Bonham drum solo.

The uptempo "Ozone Baby" and the rock'n'roll styled "Darlene" were recorded at that album's sessions at Polar Studios, Stockholm in November 1978.

"Bonzo's Montreux" was recorded at Mountain Studios, Montreux, Switzerland in September 1976. It was designed as a Bonham drum showcase, which Page treated with various electronic effects, including a harmonizer.

"Wearing and Tearing" was recorded at Polar in November 1978. It was written as a reaction to punk, and to show that Led Zeppelin could compete with the new bands. It was planned to be released as a promotional single to the audience at the 1979 Knebworth Festival, headlined by Led Zeppelin, but this was cancelled at the last minute. It was first performed live at the 1990 Silver Clef Awards Festival at Knebworth in 1990 by Plant's band with Page guesting.

Other tracks

The 1993 compact disc edition has four additional tracks from the box sets, Led Zeppelin Boxed Set (1990) and Led Zeppelin Boxed Set 2 (1993), the previously unreleased "Travelling Riverside Blues", "White Summer/Black Mountain Side" and the "Immigrant Song" b-side "Hey, Hey, What Can I Do" from the former and the previously unreleased "Baby Come On Home" from the latter.

Cover
The album cover was designed by Hipgnosis, the fifth album cover the design group designed for Led Zeppelin. It was also the last album cover Hipgnosis designed before disbanding in 1983. The main four letters CODA are from an alphabet typeface design called "Neon" designed by Bernard Allum in 1978.

Critical reception 

Reviewing for Rolling Stone in 1983, Kurt Loder hailed Coda as "a resounding farewell" and a "marvel of compression, deftly tracing the Zeppelin decade with eight powerful, previously unreleased tracks, and no unnecessary elaboration". Robert Christgau wrote in his "Consumer Guide" column for The Village Voice:

According to Julian Marszalek of The Quietus, however, "Coda has always been regarded as the band's weakest release. Made up of eight tracks that spanned Led Zeppelin's lifetime, it refused to flow as an album. Devoid of a coherent narrative, it felt tossed together to make up for contractual obligations." In a retrospective review for AllMusic, Stephen Thomas Erlewine said while it did not include all of the band's notable non-album recordings, it offered "a good snapshot of much of what made Led Zeppelin a great band" and featured mostly "hard-charging rock & roll", including "Ozone Baby", "Darlene", and "Wearing and Tearing": "rockers that alternately cut loose, groove, and menace".

2015 reissue

A remastered version of Coda, along with Presence and In Through the Out Door, was reissued on 31 July 2015. The reissue comes in six formats: a standard CD edition, a deluxe three-CD edition, a standard LP version, a deluxe three-LP version, a super deluxe three-CD plus three-LP version with a hardback book, and as high resolution 24-bit/96k digital downloads. The deluxe and super deluxe editions feature bonus material containing alternative takes and previously unreleased songs, "If It Keeps On Raining", "Sugar Mama", "Four Hands", "St. Tristan's Sword", and "Desire". The reissue was released with an altered colour version of the original album's artwork as its bonus disc's cover.

The reissue was met with generally positive reviews. At Metacritic, which assigns a normalised rating out of 100 to reviews from mainstream publications, the album received an average score of 78, based on 8 reviews. In Rolling Stone, David Fricke said it is "the unlikely closing triumph in Page's series of deluxe Zeppelin reissues: a dynamic pocket history in rarities, across three discs with 15 bonus tracks, of his band's epic-blues achievement". Pitchfork journalist Mark Richardson was less impressed by the bonus disc, believing "there is nothing particularly noteworthy about the 'Bombay Orchestra' tracks".

Track listing

Original release
All tracks produced by Jimmy Page, except for "Travelling Riverside Blues", produced by John Walters, and "White Summer/Black Mountain Side" produced by Jeff Griffin.

 Sides one and two were combined as tracks 1–8 on CD reissues.

 The CD edition with bonus tracks was also included in the career-spanning boxed set Complete Studio Recordings (disc ten), and the subsequent Led Zeppelin Definitive Collection (disc twelve).

Deluxe edition bonus discs

The CD edition of the album incorrectly lists the running time of "Bring It On Home" (Rough Mix) as 4:19, which is actually the exact time of the finished version listed on Led Zeppelin II.

Personnel
Led Zeppelin

John Bonham – drums, percussion
John Paul Jones – bass guitar, piano, keyboards
Jimmy Page – acoustic and electric guitars, electronic treatments, production
Robert Plant – lead vocals, harmonica

Production

Assorted Images – design
Barry Diament – mastering (original 1988 Compact Disc release)
Stuart Epps – engineering
Peter Grant – executive production
Jeff Griffin – producer on "White Summer/Black Mountain Side"
Hipgnosis – design
Andy Johns – engineering
Eddie Kramer – engineering
Vic Maile – engineering
George Marino – remastering (1994 edition)
Leif Mases – engineering
John Timperley – engineering
John Walters – producer on "Travelling Riverside Blues"

Charts

Certifications

References
References

Sources

External links
 
 

1982 compilation albums
Albums produced by Jimmy Page
Albums with cover art by Hipgnosis
Compilation albums published posthumously
Led Zeppelin compilation albums
Swan Song Records albums
Albums recorded at Polar Studios
Albums produced by John Walters (broadcaster)